The UNAF U-23 Tournament is a football (soccer) tournament held between nations who are  members of the UNAF association; however, some other teams which are not members are invited. Algeria will hosts the tournament in January 2015.

Winners 

 A round-robin tournament determined the final standings.

Successful national teams 

* hosts.

See also 
 UNAF U-20 Tournament
 UNAF U-18 Tournament
 UNAF U-17 Tournament
 UNAF U-15 Tournament

References

External links 
 UNAF U-23 Tournament history - unaf official website

 
UNAF competitions
Under-23 association football